List of the National Register of Historic Places listings in Montgomery County, New York

This is intended to be a complete list of properties and districts listed on the National Register of Historic Places in Montgomery County, New York.  The locations of National Register properties and districts (at least for all showing latitude and longitude coordinates below) may be seen in a map by clicking on "Map of all coordinates".  Four properties are further designated National Historic Landmarks.



Listings county-wide

|}

See also

 List of National Historic Landmarks in New York
 National Register of Historic Places listings in New York
 Schoharie Crossing State Historic Site

References

Montgomery County